Melbourne-Brighton Bus Lines was an Australian bus and coach operator in Melbourne.

History
Melbourne-Brighton Bus Lines was formed in 1954 when a multitude of operators who operated route 1 Gardenvale to Melbourne City Centre and 2 Middle Brighton to Melbourne City Centre combined. A depot was established in Brighton to house the 24 vehicle fleet.

In September 1958 route 140A Middle Brighton to St Kilda station was purchased from Eastern Suburbs Omnibus Service. In 1959 the depot was relocated to Elwood. In 1971 routes 140A, 1 and 2 were renumbered 600-602. Short journeys to Beach Avenue and Head Street were renumbered 603 and 604.

In March 1979 the Denning service agency and spare parts agency was gained. A coach operation was founded under the Melbright Coaches brand. In April 1985 the route operations were sold to the Metropolitan Transit Authority with 37 buses.

The Melbright Coaches operation was retained moving to Port Melbourne. Melbright Coaches ceased operating in November 1992 after it was unable to recover debts from Austral Denning following its entering receivership. The licences were sold to the Driver Group.

Fleet
The initial fleet consisted of Bedfords, Daimlers, Internationals, Leylands and Reos. From 1961 the company purchased heavy duty Leyland buses, for its charter operations Denning coaches. At the time of the sale of the route bus operations in April 1985 the fleet consisted of 43 buses and coaches.

In 2012 Bayside Coaches restored a Denning Landseer into Melbright Coaches livery.

References

Bus companies of Victoria (Australia)
Bus transport in Melbourne
Australian companies disestablished in 1992
Australian companies established in 1954